The stigghiola (plural: stigghiole in Italian or stigghioli in Sicilian, also known as stigghiuola)  is a Sicilian food specialty, typical of the streets of the city of Palermo. It consists of guts (usually of lamb, but also of goat or chicken) which are washed in water and salt, seasoned with parsley and often with onion and other pot herbs, then stuck on a skewer or rolled around a leek, and finally cooked directly on the grill. The dish is generally prepared and sold as a street food. In Ragusa, the dish is baked in a casserole and it is known as turciniuna. 

It is listed as a traditional Italian food product (P.A.T.) by the Ministry of Agricultural, Food and Forestry Policies.

See also
 Sicilian cuisine

References

     

Palermitan cuisine
Cuisine of Sicily
Ragusa, Sicily
Offal
Street food in Italy